Nicolae "Nae" Stanciu (born 13 November 1973) is a former Romanian professional footballer who played as a defender.

He spent most of his career with Rapid București, which he captained, and had two brief spells with Anzhi Makhachkala and FC Oradea before retiring in 2004.

Honours
Rapid București
Divizia A: 1998–99
Cupa României: 1997–98, 2001–02; runner-up: 1994–95, 1998–99
Supercupa României: 1999, 2002

References

External links
 

1973 births
Footballers from Bucharest
Living people
Romanian footballers
Association football defenders
Liga I players
FC Rapid București players
Russian Premier League players
FC Anzhi Makhachkala players
FC Bihor Oradea players
Romanian expatriate footballers
Expatriate footballers in Russia
Romanian expatriate sportspeople in Russia